Elachista luticomella is a moth of the family Elachistidae. It is found in most of Europe.

The moth flies from June to August depending on the location. The head is light ochreous-yellow, seldom with a fuscous spot. Forewings are dark fuscous ; a somewhat oblique fascia before middle, a smalltornal spot, and another on costa beyond it ochreous-whitish, in female enlarged and more conspicuous. Hindwings  are blackish grey.The larva is pale yellow ; head pale brown.

The larvae feed on hairy brome (Bromus ramosus), cock's-foot (Dactylis glomerata), tufted hairgrass (Deschampsia cespitosa), giant fescue (Festuca gigantea), meadow fescue (Festuca pratensis), perennial ryegrass (Lolium perenne), wood melick (Melica uniflora), wood millet (Milium effusum), Poa humilis and smooth meadow-grass (Poa pratensis). They mine the leaves of their host plant. The mine has the form of a long, narrow, white corridor, descending from close to the leaf tip to the leaf base or even the stem. The frass is deposited in an inconspicuous grey line. Larvae can be found from late autumn to May and are bright yellow.

References

luticomella
Leaf miners
Moths described in 1839
Moths of Europe
Taxa named by Philipp Christoph Zeller